This list of Scottish writers is an incomplete alphabetical list of Scottish writers who have a Wikipedia page. Those on the list were born and/or brought up in Scotland. They include writers of all genres, writing in English, Lowland Scots, Scottish Gaelic, Latin, French or any other language. Please help by adding new names, using the present entry format as far as possible. Writers put on the list who are still without a Wikipedia page have been transferred to the "No-pagers" section on the Talk page.

Abbreviations used: awa = also writes/wrote as, b. = born, c. = circa, fl. = floruit (flourished), or. = originally, RC = Roman Catholic, SF = science fiction, YA = young-adult.

This is a subsidiary list to the List of Scots.

A

B

C

D

E

F

G

H

I

J

K

L

M

N

O

P

Q

R

S

T

U

W

Y

See also

List of Scottish dramatists
List of Scottish novelists
List of Scottish poets
List of Scottish science fiction writers
List of Scottish short story writers
Lists of writers
Scottish literature
Writers' Museum